"Let's Kill Music" is the first widely available Cooper Temple Clause single, entering at #41 in the UK Singles Chart, and the first to have a promo video.

Track listings
CD1
"Let's Kill Music"
"Panzer Attack (Dirty Sanchez mix)"
"Let's Kill Music" (video)

CD2
"Let's Kill Music"
"My Darling (Nasty Angel)"
"Let's Kill Music (Dirty Sanchez mix)"

7"
"Let's Kill Music"
"Girl Ink Age"

12" remixes
"Let's Kill Music"
"Panzer Attack (Dirty Sanchez mix)"
"Let's Kill Music (Dirty Sanchez mix)"

Japanese edition
"Let's Kill Music"
"My Darling (Nasty Angel)"
"Let's Kill Music (Dirty Sanchez mix)"
"Panzer Attack (Dirty Sanchez mix)"

2001 singles
The Cooper Temple Clause songs
2001 songs